Kenneth Arthur Huszagh (September 3, 1891 – January 11, 1950) was an American competition swimmer who represented the United States at the 1912 Summer Olympics in Stockholm, Sweden.

Huszagh was born in Chicago; his paternal immigrant ancestor came from the Austria-Hungary Empire (now Slovakia). He was nicknamed "Ken" as a boy and attended local schools in Chicago. He became active as a competitive swimmer in the Chicago Athletic Club. He attended Northwestern University, where he competed as a swimmer on their Wildcats team. 

Huszagh made the 1912 US Olympics team and competed in the 100-meter freestyle, in which he won a bronze medal.  He also was a member of United States' 4×200-meter freestyle relay team, which won a silver medal. For a time he held a world record in swimming. 

Huszagh was later involved in the founding of the town of Kildeer, Illinois, along with the help of his family. He later became an executive with the American Mineral Spirits Company of New York and rose to president of that company before retiring. He moved to Delray Beach, Florida.

See also
 List of Northwestern University alumni
 List of Olympic medalists in swimming (men)
 World record progression 4 × 200 metres freestyle relay

References

External links
  Ken Huszagh – Olympic athlete profile at Sports-Reference.com

1891 births
1950 deaths
American male freestyle swimmers
World record setters in swimming
Northwestern Wildcats men's swimmers
Olympic bronze medalists for the United States in swimming
Olympic silver medalists for the United States in swimming
Swimmers from Chicago
Swimmers at the 1912 Summer Olympics
Medalists at the 1912 Summer Olympics
People from Lake County, Illinois
19th-century American people
20th-century American people